Hypericum prolificum, known as shrubby St. John's wort, is a deciduous shrub in the genus Hypericum. It was named for its "prolific" number of stamens.

Description
The ovary is usually three-parted, though may have up to five parts in some individuals.

Distribution and habitat
Hypericum prolificum is native to the central and eastern United States and Ontario.  Habitats include riparian areas, slopes, thickets, swamp edges, and oak woodlands.

Gallery

References

prolificum
Flora of North America